The Central American Sports Organization (acronym: ORDECA; in Spanish: Organización Deportiva Centroamericana) is an international organization which represents the current 8 National Olympic Committees of the Central American region.  It is affiliated with the Pan American Sports Organization.

It was established on 15 July 1972. It is recognised by the International Olympic Committee (IOC) that approved its creation at the Congress of the XX Olympiad, held in Munich, Germany, in 1972.

Members
The five founding members were the Olympic Committees of Costa Rica, El Salvador, Guatemala, Honduras and Panama. At a later date, Nicaragua and Belize were also included to raise the number of members to seven, Puerto Rico was also included as a candidate member.

The eight Olympic Committee members are:

 Belize Olympic and Commonwealth Games Association
 Costa Rican Olympic Committee
 El Salvador Olympic Committee
 Guatemalan Olympic Committee
 Honduran Olympic Committee
 Nicaraguan Olympic Committee
 Panama Olympic Committee
 Puerto Rico Olympic Committee (candidate)

Administration
The ORDECA is the governing body of the Central American Games.

The then President of Olympic Committee of Guatemala Luis Canella Gutiérrez, was elected the first President of ORDECA.

References 

Sports organizations established in 1972
Sports governing bodies in North America